Guillelmum de Canaberiis was a Medieval Knight, Sheriff or Alguacil of Bourges. He served in the court of Louis IX of France.

Born in France, Canaberiis was sheriff of Paris from 1258 to 1262, and was appointed sheriff of Berry in 1263. He also  served as "miles regis" (soldier of king) between 1265-1266.

References

External links 

www.mgh-bibliothek.de

Sheriffs
Military personnel from Paris
13th-century French people
14th-century French people
Philip IV of France